Guy of Dampierre, Count of Zeeland, also called Guy of Namur (ca. 1272 – 13 October 1311 in Pavia), was a Flemish noble who was the Lord of Ronse and later the self-proclaimed Count of Zeeland. He was a younger son of Guy, Count of Flanders and Isabelle of Luxembourg.

In 1302, with his father in prison and Flanders under French occupation, he was sent by his elder brother John I, Marquis of Namur, to take command of the rebellion there. He led the troops from western Flanders at the Battle of the Golden Spurs, and received great acclamation for the victory there. He took the title of Count of Zeeland and invaded Zeeland; but the French raised new armies, and he was beaten at the 1304 naval Battle of Zierikzee and became a captive of the count of Holland. Abandoning his designs on Zeeland, he went on campaign in Italy with his cousin Henry VII, Holy Roman Emperor. There he married Margaret, daughter of Theobald II, Duke of Lorraine. He died soon thereafter, without issue.

External links 
 Main Characters of the Battle of Kortrijk 

1311 deaths
Guy
1270s births
Military personnel of the Holy Roman Empire
Flemish nobility 
Flemish soldiers 
County of Flanders 
Franco-Flemish War